Weightmans is a top 45 UK law firm with 10 offices, employing more than 1,400 people, including more than 225 partners.

The firm offers a range of legal services to public organisations, private companies and individuals. In the financial year ending April 2022, its turnover was £103.2 million.

History 
Weightmans can trace its roots back to 1827 when the firm Rutherfords was established in Liverpool. The firm Field and Weightman was established in 1875.  In 1887 the firm Weightman Peddar and Weightman was established, becoming known as Weightmans Peddar in 1913 before changing its name to Weightmans in 1970.  In 1988 Weightmans and Rutherfords merged to create Weightman Rutherfords and remained known by this name until 1996 when the firm changed its name back to Weightmans and opened a Birmingham office.

In 2002, Weightmans merged with a team from the firm Vizard Oldham and became known as Weightman Vizards – with offices in Birmingham, Leicester, Liverpool, London and Manchester.  In 2004, the firm again changed its name back to Weightmans before acquiring LLP status in 2007. In 2011 the firm acquired offices in Dartford (through the acquisition of the Insurance practice of Vizards Wyeth) and Knutsford (through a merger with Mace & Jones).

In 2013, Weightmans further expanded its national reach through the acquisition of the Manchester team of Semple Fraser and opened a Glasgow office.

In July 2015, Weightmans merged with Ford & Warren solicitors, acquiring a Leeds office.

In October 2019, Weightmans acquired the practice of Newcastle-headquartered firm, Watson Burton, adding a Newcastle office.

In June 2022, Weightmans and RadcliffesLeBrasseur completed a merger. Through the merger, Weightmans acquired an office in Cardiff.

Clients 
The firm’s clients include insurance companies, healthcare practitioners and organisations, local government bodies, UK PLCs, multinational companies, education establishments, private individuals, SMEs and other managed businesses.

Offices  
Weightmans is headquartered in Liverpool's commercial district and has offices in eight other cities throughout the United Kingdom: Birmingham, Cardiff, Glasgow, Leeds, Leicester, two in London, Manchester and Newcastle.

See also
List of largest United Kingdom-based law firms

References

Law firms
Law firms of the United Kingdom
Law firms established in 1827
Law firms established in the 19th century
1827 establishments in the United Kingdom
Law firms of England
Law firms of Wales
Law firms of Scotland
Companies based in Liverpool
Companies based in the City of London
Law firms based in Cardiff
Law firms based in London
Intellectual property law firms
Insolvency and corporate recovery firms
Legal organisations based in the United Kingdom
Business services companies of the United Kingdom